Barry Breen (born 7 January 1948) is a former Australian rules footballer in the Victorian Football League, playing with St Kilda Football Club. Breen attended De La Salle College, Malvern. His grandfather was a Gaelic footballer with the Kerry senior team, winning an All-Ireland Senior Football Championship medal in 1914.

He kicked a wobbly punt that bounced through for a behind that broke the deadlock with Collingwood late in the 1966 Grand Final that became St Kilda's first and, to date, only premiership. He was captain in 1979 and former club games record holder having played in 300 career games. He was also the last member of the 1966 premiership team to retire. 
After retiring from football Breen became Sydney Swans general manager and was president of the Tasmanian Football League from 1992 until 1995.

References

External links
Barry Breen profile at Saints.com.au
St Kilda Football Club Honour Roll

Australian rules footballers from Victoria (Australia)
St Kilda Football Club players
St Kilda Football Club Premiership players
North Shore Australian Football Club players
1948 births
Living people
Australian people of Irish descent
One-time VFL/AFL Premiership players